Fitou is a large French wine appellation in Languedoc-Roussillon, France. The dominant vine variety is Carignan which has to constitute 40% of any blend. Grenache, Lladoner Pelut (the 'hairy' Grenache), Mourvèdre and Syrah are also often blended with it. Muscat de Rivesaltes AOC, a vin doux naturel, also comes from the region.

Production area 

The production area covers the following communes of the Aude department:
 Canton of Durban-Corbières : Cascastel-des-Corbières and Villeneuve-les-Corbières
 Canton of Tuchan : Paziols and Tuchan
 Canton of Sigean : Caves, Fitou, La Palme, Leucate and Treilles

See also 
 List of appellations in Languedoc-Roussillon

References

External links 
 

Languedoc-Roussillon wine AOCs